The 1996 LPGA Championship was the 42nd LPGA Championship, played May 9–12 at DuPont Country Club in Wilmington, Delaware.

Laura Davies won the second of her two LPGA Championship titles at even par, one stroke ahead of runner-up Julie Piers. It was the third of Davies' four major titles. Rain and wind hampered play; the first round was delayed until Friday and the second round was not completed until Sunday morning; the championship was reduced to 54 holes and ended on Sunday. It was the first women's major in twelve years to have a winning score of par or above, last at the 1984 U.S. Women's Open.

This was the third of eleven consecutive LPGA Championships at DuPont Country Club.

Past champions in the field

Made the cut

Source:

Missed the cut

Source:

Final leaderboard
Sunday, May 12, 1996

Source:

References

External links
Golf Observer leaderboard

Women's PGA Championship
Golf in Delaware
LPGA Championship
LPGA Championship
LPGA Championship
LPGA Championship
Women's sports in Delaware